Boukris or Boucris was an Aetolian pirate in the 3rd century BC who raided the Attic countryside and carried off slaves for sale to Crete. The incident is known from a Greek inscription where the Athenians honoured Eumaridas, a Cretan from Kydonia, for releasing the captives. He may be the same person with Boukris son of Daitas from Naupactus, proxenos in Delos. Boukris was also a hieromnemon of the Aetolians in Delphi in the same century.

References
de Souza, Philip. Piracy in the Graeco-Roman World, pp. 66–67 
Grainger, John D. The League of the Aitolians, p. 21 
IG II² 844 Athens
IG XI,4 692 Delos
FD III 3:190 Delphi

Ancient Aetolians
3rd-century BC Greek people
Ancient Greek pirates
Hellenistic Athens
Proxenoi
Hellenistic Crete